Antonia San Juan Fernández (born 22 May 1961) is a Spanish actress, director and screenwriter.

Biography 
She was born in Las Palmas de Gran Canaria, Spain.  At 19 she went to Madrid, where she started working as a professional theatre actress and also as a cabaret act in pubs and bars. She became known thanks to her role as Agrado in Todo sobre mi madre by Pedro Almodóvar. She is well known in Spain not only because of her film career but also for her humorous monologues on television and theatre . Since 2009 she has been acting in the popular Spanish TV series La que se avecina, playing the part of Estela Reynolds, the eccentric mother of Lola.

She is an atheist and is highly critical of religion, calling it a "cancer to society."

Filmography

Film
La vida siempre es corta – 1994
Perdona bonita, pero Lucas me quería a mí – 1997
La primera noche de mi vida – 1998
El grito en el cielo – 1998
Ataque verbal – 1999
Manolito Gafotas – 1999
All About My Mother (Todo sobre mi madre) – 1999
Hongos – 1999
El pan de cada día, El – 2000
Asfalto – 2000
V.O. – 2001
Octavia – 2002
La balsa de piedra – 2002
Amnèsia – 2002
Piedras – 2002
Venganza – 2002
238 – 2003
Colours – 2003
Mela y sus hermanas – 2004
Te llevas la palma – 2004
La china – 2005
Un buen día – 2005
Un dulce despertar – 2005
El hambre – 2005
La maldad de las cosas – 2005
La nevera – 2005
La caja – 2006
Del lado del verano – 2012
The Platform (El Hoyo) – 2019

Television

References

Bibliography

External links
 
 

1961 births
Living people
Spanish women comedians
Spanish stand-up comedians
Spanish film actresses
Spanish women film directors
Spanish stage actresses
Spanish women writers
Spanish atheists
Critics of religions
People from Las Palmas